Brian Bades (born 3 July 1939) is an English former footballer, who played as a winger in the Football League for Chester. He also played in the league for Accrington Stanley, but their results and player appearances were expunged due to the club failing to complete their scheduled fixtures in the 1961–62 season.

References

1939 births
Living people
People from Farnworth
Association football wingers
Accrington Stanley F.C. (1891) players
Leigh Genesis F.C. players
Chester City F.C. players
Runcorn F.C. Halton players
English Football League players
English footballers